Oughterard (“a high place”) is an ecclesiastical hilltop site, graveyard, townland, and formerly a parish, borough and royal manor in County Kildare, nowadays part of the community of Ardclough, close to the Dublin border. It is the burial place of Arthur Guinness.

Foundation
The round tower and ancient monastery is associated with a nunnery established 5 AD by foundress Saint Briga (feast day 21 January).

Bríga, daughter of Congall, who is also associated with Brideschurch near Sallins (.), and possibly with Kilbride in County Waterford (.), is not to be confused with Brigit of Kildare daughter of Dubhthach, the famous St Brigid whose feast day was 1 February St Brigid, daughter of Doma, whose feast day was 7 February or the earlier St Brigid, daughter of Neman, also associated with Kildare and said to have been veiled by St Patrick, whose feast day was 9 March (Seathrún Céitinn's History of Ireland 1841 edition edited by Dermod O'Connor lists 14 Saints gleaned from the martyrologies and heroic literature each called Brigid, not including Bríga or Brigit of Kildare). The Martyrology of Donegal lists Brighit daughter of Diomman (feast day 21 May), Brighit of Moin-miolain (feast day on 9 March), and what may be five more: Brigid the daughter of Leinin (associated with Killiney, feast day 6 March), Brighit of Cillmuine (12 November), Brighe of Cairbre (feast day 7 January). and two other Brighits (feast days 9 March, the second Brigit of that date, and 30 Sept).

The pre-Christian site stands on a ley line between the Longstone Rath and running north to a ford over the River Liffey at Donaghcumper Church, Celbridge. The early Christian church often built upon formerly druidic sites.

Derchairthinn
The site is also associated also with another sixth-century female saint, Saint Derchairthinn (feast day 8 March) "of the race of Colla Uais, Monarch of Érinn." Colla was a son of Cairbre Lifechair and High King in 306–310.

Political patronage
This monastery was under the patronage of a local branch of the Uí Dúnlainge dynasty which rotated the kingship of Leinster between 750–1050. In that period a sub-dynasty known as Uí Fáeláin formed, which included ten Uí Dúnchada Kings of Leinster. They established their base at nearby Lyons Hill. Their cousins patronised the monastery of Kildare and Glendalough.

Royal manor

Ougherard became a Royal Manor and Borough in the 12th century and a ruined castle nearby dates to 1300. Plough headlands from medieval times can still be seen in fields adjoining the churchyard.

Medieval landmarks

Recent research by archaeological historian Mike O'Neill has established the ruined church on the site dates to c. 1350 and not, as previously thought, 1609. The ruined church is now entered through one of the windows, as both original doorways serve as mausoleums. The 8th century round tower, one of five in County Kildare, is in a good state of repair, but it is topless and only the first 8 metres remain. A small ruined castle tower stands about 300 metres southeast of the graveyard.

Destruction and restoration

The hilltop monastery and round tower were burned by the Dublin Vikings under Sigtrygg Silkbeard in 995. During the Norman invasion of Ireland in 1169–71, the parish was a part of the large estates given as a dowry by Dermot McMurrough on the marriage of his daughter Eva (Aoife) to Strongbow in 1170. Next, it was owned by Adam de Hereford, who willed all his lands to St Thomas monastery in Thomas Street, Dublin, and died in 1210. For several centuries the monastery rented the land to tenant farmers until the Dissolution of the Monasteries in 1536–41. The 1303 Papal taxation listed it as 'Outherard' and it was also spelt as 'Wochtred' before 1500. The parish of Oughterard was eventually united with Lyons in 1541. The calendar rolls reference 1609, which led to its mistakenly being cited as a foundation date by Walter Fitzgerald in 1898. This was followed by another which described the church as being "in ruins" by 1620. It is not clear when the church fell into disuse.

Civil survey 1654–56
Sir Philip Perceval (d.1647) owned Castlewarden when listed in the Survey of 1640. Some of his estate papers were published in the "Egmont Manuscripts" in 1905.

Following the Cromwellian conquest of Ireland in 1649–53, land had to be surveyed and then often confiscated from parliament's opponents to pay its debts under the 1642 Adventurers Act. The survey listed four townlands in Oughterard parish; Oughterard, Bishopscourt, Hutton Read and Castlewarden. Oughterard was valued at £82 p.a. rental value and it belonged to four men.

Arthur Guinness and other notable burials

Until the construction of the turnpike road in the adjoining valley in 1729, Oughterard was situated on the main road from Dublin to Limerick and Cork. According to "Arthur's Round" (see below) Arthur Guinness's grandfather William Read, a local farmer, started selling home-brewed ale from a roadside stall in 1690 to troops en route to the battles in the Jacobite wars. Guinness was taken back to Oughterard to be buried in the Read family plot in January 1803. Local tradition holds that Guinness was born at the Read household, where his mother returned to her childhood home, in the tradition of the time, to give birth. Three prospective birth sites have been identified, most likely at Oughterard ., but also possibly at Read homesteads the adjoining townlands of Boston ., Castlewarden . and Huttonread. which takes its name form the Read family., all within Oughterard parish.

Later in 1803 Arthur Wolfe, Lord Kilwarden who lived at Newlands, Co Dublin—the most famous victim of Robert Emmet's 1803 rebellion—was buried here in the Wolfe mausoleum, a grave that dates to 1650. James Phipps, "A Captain of Insurgents" who took part in the Battle of Ovidstown in 1798, and then moved to America where he died in 1826, is commemorated, as is William Kennedy from nearby Bishopscourt, who was posthumously decorated for bravery having lost his life in the Battle of the Bulge during World War II.

Duel
Daniel O'Connell (1775–1847) fought a duel with John D'Esterre on 1 February 1815 in an adjoining field, then a part of the Ponsonbys' Bishopscourt estate, now owned by the King family. O'Connell described a Dublin Corporation provision for the poor as "beggarly" on 24 Jan and was issued the challenge from John D'Esterre, a champion of the conservative and Protestant cause at the time. D'Esterre died as a result of his wounds. A detachment of cavalry sent out from Dublin arrived too late to prevent the duel from taking place. A commemorative boulder having been removed, the exact site was re-established in 2007 after consultations with local people.

Trivia
In the film Mission: Impossible , Tom Cruise's character is told that a US senator is unavailable "because he is fishing at the Oughter Ard Slew in Co. Kildare." The Grand Canal holds fish and runs about 1 km to the north. There is no river in Oughter Ard, and mostly refers to Oughterard, Co. Galway.

Bibliography
Eoghan Corry and Jim Tancred; Annals of Ardclough (2004).
DN Hall M Hennessy and Tadhg O'Keefe; Medieval Agriculture and Settlement in Castlewarden and Oughterard.  Irish Geography, Vol 18 (1985) pp. 16–25.
Kildare Archaeological Society Journal. Volume I: pp. 84–86.   Volume II: pp. 179, 183, 395.  Volume III: pp. 361, 364, 456.  Volume IV: pp. 255.   Volume XII: pp. 339–341.
P Guinness; Arthur's Round:  The Life and Times of brewing legend Arthur Guinness. Peter Owen, London 2008; pp. 17–20, 218.

References

External links
 Oughterard Round Tower and cemetery
 GAA club website featuring local information

Civil parishes of County Kildare
Religion in County Kildare
Cemeteries in County Kildare
Townlands of County Kildare